Olímpico Pirambu Futebol Clube, commonly known as Olímpico de Pirambu, is a Brazilian football club based in Pirambu, Sergipe state. They competed in the Série C and in the Copa do Brasil once.

History
The club was founded on September 4, 1931, in Aracaju, as Siqueira Campos Futebol Clube.The team then changed its name to Olímpico Futebol Clube in 1939.In 1996, the team moved to Itabi due to financial problems, only to move to Carmópolis in the following year and to Lagarto in the same year. The team eventually moved to Pirambu in 2005, changing its name to Olímpico Pirambu Futebol Clube. Olímpico de Pirambu won the Campeonato Sergipano Série A2 in 2005, and the Campeonato Sergipano in 2006. They competed in the Série C in 2006, when they were eliminated in the First Stage, and in the Copa do Brasil in 2007, when they were eliminated in the First Round by Corinthians.

Achievements

 Campeonato Sergipano:
 Winners (3): 1946, 1947, 2006
 Campeonato Sergipano Série A2:
 Winners (3): 1985, 1987, 2005

Stadium
Olímpico Pirambu Futebol Clube play their home games at Estádio André Moura. The stadium has a maximum capacity of 3,000 people. The club also played at Estádio Valberto Gomes de Conceição, nicknamed Bebetão. This stadium has a maximum capacity of 4,000 people.

References

Association football clubs established in 1931
Football clubs in Sergipe
1931 establishments in Brazil